Bill Cunningham (born August 12, 1967) is a Democratic member of the Illinois Senate, representing the 18th District. The 18th district includes all or parts of Beverly, Mount Greenwood, Morgan Park and Auburn-Gresham in Chicago and the suburbs of Evergreen Park, Chicago Ridge, Oak Lawn, Worth, Palos Heights and Orland Park.

Prior to his election to the Illinois Senate, he was a member of the Illinois House of Representatives, representing the 35th District.

After the election of President of the Illinois Senate, Don Harmon (the former President pro tempore) named Cunningham as President pro tempore of the Illinois Senate on January 30, 2020.

As of July 2022, Senator Cunningham is a member of the following Illinois Senate committees:

 Agriculture Committee (SAGR)
 Appropriations - Agriculture, Environment & Energy Committee (SAPP-SAAE)
 Appropriations - Higher Education Committee (SAPP-SAHE)
 Appropriations Committee (SAPP)
 Assignment Committee (SCOA)
 Energy and Public Utilities Committee (SENE)
 Ethics Committee (SETH)
 Executive Committee (SEXC)
 Executive Appointments Committee (SEXA)
 (Chairman of) Executive - Gaming Committee (SEXC-SESG)
 Executive - Liquor Committee (SEXC-SELI)
 Higher Education Committee (SCHE)
 Redistricting Committee (SRED)
 Redistrcting - Chicago South (SRED-SRCS)

References

External links 
Biography, bills and committees at the 98th Illinois General Assembly
By session: 98th, 97th
Illinois State Senator Bill Cunningham legislative website
Senator Bill Cunningham at Illinois Senate Democrats
 
 Illinois House, Dist. 35: Bill Cunningham, Chicago Sun-Times

|-

1967 births
21st-century American politicians
Democratic Party Illinois state senators
Living people
Democratic Party members of the Illinois House of Representatives
University of Illinois Chicago alumni